Blairmore is a village located on the Cowal peninsula in Argyll and Bute, Scotland. Blairmore lies within the Loch Lomond and The Trossachs National Park. The village was largely built during the Victorian era and has a small wooden pier which dates to 1855.

Gallery

References

External links 

 Blairmore Gallery - website
 Blairmore and Strone Golf Club - website
 Blairmore Heritage - website
 Loch Lomond and The Trossachs National Park - website

Villages in Cowal
Firth of Clyde
Highlands and Islands of Scotland